The Otesaga Hotel or Otesage Resort Hotel is a historic hotel located in the Village of Cooperstown, New York on Lake Street (NY-80). It was built in 1909 in the Federal style. The hotel is a contributing building to the Cooperstown Historic District on the Southern shore of Lake Otsego in Cooperstown, New York.

It has been selected by the National Trust for Historic Preservation as a member of the Historic Hotels of America.

The hotel opens each year in mid April and closes after Thanksgiving. It has 135 rooms and occupies 700 feet of Otsego Lake shore. The Otesaga also has two restaurants and features an 18-hole golf course that was also established in 1909.

The hotel was designed by architect Percy Griffin, and built by Stephen Carlton Clark and his brother Edward Severin Clark. The hotel's architectural style has been described as both Federal and Neo-Georgian. The front of the building has a portico supported by eight 30-foot wooden columns.  The kitchen was originally furnished in 1909 by Duparquet, Huot & Moneuse.

The hotel has a reputation for being haunted, and was featured in an episode of the television show, "Ghost Hunters" which originally aired on August 25, 2010.

References

External links 
 Historic Hotels of America
 Cooperstown Getaway
The Otseaga Resort Hotel (Official Site)

Buildings and structures in Otsego County, New York
Historic district contributing properties in New York (state)
National Register of Historic Places in Otsego County, New York
Hotels in New York (state)
Otesaga